The following highways are numbered 870:

United States